Bedford, Pennsylvania could refer to:
 the borough of Bedford, Pennsylvania
 Bedford County, Pennsylvania
 Bedford Township, Bedford County, Pennsylvania